U.S. Route 31 (US 31) is a part of the United States Numbered Highway System that runs from Spanish Fort, Alabama, to Mackinaw City, Michigan. It enters the U.S. state of Indiana via the George Rogers Clark Memorial Bridge between Louisville, Kentucky, and Clarksville, Indiana. The  of US 31 that lie within Indiana serve as a major conduit. Some of the highway is listed on the National Highway System. Various sections are rural two-lane highway and urbanized four- or six-lane divided expressway. The northernmost community along the highway is South Bend near the Michigan state line.

US 31 was first designated as a US Highway in October 1926. A northern section (from Rochester to South Bend) and a far southern section (on old US 31W into Louisville on the K&I Bridge) of the highway originally served as part of the Dixie Highway. US 31 was the Jackson Highway from Indianapolis to Seymour. US 31 replaced the original State Road 1 (SR 1) designation of the highway which dated back to the formation of the Indiana State Road system. SR 1 ran from Clarksville through Indianapolis to South Bend and ended at the Michigan state line.

Route description
Only the segment of US 31 that is north of Indianapolis is included as a part of the National Highway System (NHS).  The NHS is a network of highways that are identified as being most important for the economy, mobility and defense of the nation.  The highway is maintained by the Indiana Department of Transportation (INDOT) like all other U.S. Routes in the state. The department tracks the traffic volumes along all state highways as a part of its maintenance responsibilities using a metric called average annual daily traffic (AADT). This measurement is a calculation of the traffic level along a segment of roadway for any average day of the year. In 2010, INDOT figured that lowest traffic levels were the 3,690 personal vehicles and 160 commercial vehicles that used the highway daily near Memphis. The peak traffic volume was 168,770 personal vehicles and 18,090 commercial vehicles along the section of US 31 concurrent with Interstate 465 (I–465).

Jeffersonville to Columbus
US 31 overlaps I-65 in Jeffersonville, after crossing the George Rogers Clark Memorial Bridge from Kentucky.  It then diverges as the access frontage lanes before splitting off north of Jeffersonville at Clarksville and proceeding to Indianapolis.  US 31 was widened to two lanes in both directions for its length through Columbus in the early 2000s.

Columbus to Indianapolis
At I-465 on the south side of Indianapolis, US 31 is routed onto I-465 on the east side of the city. This is the closest approach the highway makes to downtown Indianapolis. Previously the northbound route of the highway through Indianapolis was on East Street, Madison Avenue, Delaware Street, North Street, and onto Meridian Street; southbound was on Meridian Street, North Street, Pennsylvania Street, Madison Avenue, and onto East Street.

Indianapolis to Michigan
US 31 exits I-465 (coincidentally at exit 31) in Carmel, and continues northward as a freeway through Westfield. North of SR 38, it reverts to a divided highway until reaching the Kokomo area, where it again becomes a full freeway to bypass that city to the east. North of the Kokomo area US 31 again becomes a rural divided highway, which skirts Peru, Rochester, and Plymouth. At US 30 east of Plymouth, US 31 becomes a freeway again and remains so for the rest of its journey in the state. After bypassing Lakeville to the east, US 31 approaches South Bend. There the route converges with US 20 (St. Joseph Valley Parkway) and proceeds west and then north to bypass South Bend. After US 20 splits off to the west near the South Bend Airport, US 31 has an interchange with the Indiana Toll Road (I-80/I-90) before proceeding north into Michigan.

History
US 31 was signed into law by the Governor on March 7, 1917, as Main Market Highway 1, and signs were installed on June 1 of that year. The name was changed to State Road 1 within a year when Indiana began the state road system. By 1924, most of the route was paved, leaving only from Columbus to Franklin and from Peru to Plymouth that was unpaved. On October 1, 1926, US 31 was designated along what was SR 1 at the time.

In the late 2000s, INDOT began a process of converting US 31 to Interstate Highway standards from South Bend to Indianapolis. Three projects were completed in the early 2010s: an upgrade of the road from I-465 in Indianapolis to SR 38 north of Westfield, a new  freeway bypass of Kokomo, and a new freeway segment from Plymouth to South Bend, which was constructed largely on a new alignment. A portion of the Plymouth–South Bend section was dedicated as the Richard W. Mangus Memorial Highway, in honor of the local state representative who supported the freeway's construction, at the ribbon-cutting ceremony on August 27. The entirety of the former segment of US 31 bypassed by the freeway segment in Kokomo and a portion of the one bypassed between Plymouth and South Bend were designated as SR 931.

Future
The remaining  of US 31 between South Bend and Indianapolis is gradually being converted to a limited access highway without traffic signals, starting with an interchange at SR 28 in Tipton County which opened in November 2016. As of 2018, there were six traffic signals left between Indianapolis and South Bend, and a program introduced by Governor Eric Holcomb in September 2018 proposed to remove four of those. All six signals are expected to be removed by 2026.

The approximately  stretch of US 31 between SR 38 in Hamilton County and SR 931 in Tipton County, south of Kokomo, was planned to be converted to freeway, with estimated completion in 2025. However, after the state determined that the original plans would severely limit access within Tipton County, those upgrades were removed from consideration until further study could be completed and these issues mitigated.  Current upgrade plans are only slated for Hamilton County.

Major intersections

Supplemental routes

See also

U.S. Route 41 in Indiana
Indiana State Road 331
Indiana State Road 431
Indiana State Road 931
Indiana State Road 933

References

External links

 Indiana
31
Transportation in South Bend, Indiana
Transportation in Indianapolis
Transportation in Clark County, Indiana
Transportation in Scott County, Indiana
Transportation in Jackson County, Indiana
Transportation in Bartholomew County, Indiana
Transportation in Johnson County, Indiana
Transportation in Marion County, Indiana
Transportation in Hamilton County, Indiana
Transportation in Tipton County, Indiana
Transportation in Howard County, Indiana
Transportation in Miami County, Indiana
Transportation in Fulton County, Indiana
Transportation in Marshall County, Indiana
Transportation in St. Joseph County, Indiana